Ilaria Venturini Fendi is an Italian fashion designer and entrepreneur.

Career
Following in the footstep of her mother Anna Fendi, formerly Creative Director of the Fendi brand, she was very young when she started her career in fashion after graduating from Istituto Europeo di Design. One of her first working experiences was with Karl Lagerfeld at Chanel in Paris. Back in Rome she entered the family firm becoming Accessories Creative Director of the Fendissime young line and also Fendi Shoe Designer, a position she maintained after the company was sold to the French group LVMH. While still loving her work very much, after some time she started feeling uneasy at the idea that every collection and the hard work behind it was doomed to become old right after its presentation. In 2003 she therefore decided to leave the family firm to dedicate herself to nature and the environment, a passion inherited in childhood from her father.

Carmina Campus
She bought a country estate of about 430 acres in Northern Rome, I Casali del Pino, and while converting the farm to organic cultivation she became increasingly involved with environmental issues and creative reuse of wasted materials. 
Enlightened by this new awareness she created in 2006 her sustainable fashion and design brand Carmina Campus, that produces high-end bags, accessories and design objects with discarded materials and the manufacturing skills of Italian artisans.
In 2009 she started a collaboration with the International Trade Centre (ITC), a UN - WTO agency that works in developing countries creating job opportunities in many industries. The program involved disadvantaged women's communities in Kenya and Uganda for the production of a special Carmina Campus bag line entirely made in Africa. The aim was to provide the workers with professional know-how in order to favor the creation of independent micro-entrepreneurs.
She also collaborated with Socially MadeinItaly, an Italian non-profit organization that operates in Italian prisons, to support a joint rehabilitation program involving the production of a special Carmina Campus bag collection made in prison hubs that was first launched in February 2015. 
The project was certified by Italy's Ministry of Justice and initially involved four prison hubs that later became eleven. In December 2015 the project was presented in Palermo, Sicily, and then made available to the public in a store confiscated from the Mafia.

She was among the supporters of The Circle, the non-profit organization created in 2012 by Annie Lennox to promote and finance projects in favor of disadvantaged women and was among the co-founders of its spinoff, The Circle Italia.

Awards

Further reading
Black, Kate (2015), Magnifeco: Your head-to-Toe Guide to Ethical fashion and non-toxic beauty, New Society Publisher, p. 185, 
Ceppa, Clara (2014),Spreading the culture of a sustainable manufacturing of eco-fashion products. Focus on international brands that make the synergy between fashion design and sustainability their success, Trans Tech Publications, Switzerland, ISSN: 1662-7482, Vols. 496-500, pp 2692-2696  
Rinaldi, Francesca Romana-Testa, Salvo (2015) The Responsible Fashion Company-Integrating Ethics and Aesthetics in the Value Chain, Routledge, London  
 Martin-Leke S., Ellis E. (2014) Towards a Definition of Authentic African Luxury: Luxe Ubuntu in: Atwal G., Bryson D. (eds) Luxury Brands in Emerging Markets, Palgrave Macmillan, London

References

External links

Living people
1966 births
Fashion designers from Rome
Italian fashion designers
Italian women fashion designers
Italian interior designers
Sustainable design
Fendi